Solanco School District is a large, rural public school district located in the southern end of Lancaster County (SoLanCo - Southern Lancaster County), Pennsylvania. Solanco School District serves: Providence Township, Eden Township, Quarryville Borough, Little Britain Township, Bart Township, Colerain Township, Drumore Township, East Drumore Township and Fulton Township. According to 2008 local census data, it served a resident population of 30,566. By 2010, the district's population increased to 31,871 people. In 2009, the district residents’ per capita income was $17,040, while the median family income was $49,432. In the Commonwealth, the median family income was $49,501 and the United States median family income was $49,445, in 2010.

The district operates seven schools: four elementary, two middle/junior high, one high school and a virtual academy (K-12).

Elementary schools are:
Quarryville Elementary School
Providence Elementary School
Bart-Colerain Elementary School
Clermont Elementary School
Middle schools:
George A. Smith Middle School
Swift Middle School
High school:
Solanco High School

Extracurriculars
Solanco School District offers a variety of clubs, activities and an extensive sports program.

Sports
The district funds:

Boys
Baseball - AAAA
Basketball- AAAA
Cross Country - AAA
Football - AAA
Golf - AAAA
Indoor Track and Field - AAAA
Soccer - AAA
Track and Field - AAA
Wrestling	- AAA

Girls
Basketball - AAAA
Cross Country - AAA
Indoor Track and Field - AAAA
Field Hockey - AAA
Soccer (Fall) - AAA
Softball - AAAA
Girls' Tennis - AAA
Track and Field - AAA
Volleyball - AAA

Junior High School Sports

Boys
Basketball
Cross Country
Football
Soccer
Track and Field
Wrestling	

Girls
Basketball
Cross Country
Field Hockey
Soccer (Fall)
Track and Field
Volleyball

According to PIAA directory July 2012

References

External links 
 

School districts in Lancaster County, Pennsylvania